This article details the Wrestling at the 2008 Summer Olympics qualifying phase.

Seven places have been reserved for the host nation China. The remaining spots are allocated through the qualification process, wherein the athletes earn places for their respective nation. FILA also determined that at the continental championships, only nations which entered an athlete at each weight class at the 2007 World Championships in Baku, Azerbaijan were eligible to qualify their nation for the Olympics at that weight.

Timeline

Qualification summary

Men's freestyle events

55 kg

60 kg

66 kg

74 kg

84 kg

96 kg

120 kg

Men's Greco-Roman events

55 kg

60 kg

66 kg

74 kg

84 kg

96 kg

120 kg

Women's freestyle events

48 kg

55 kg

63 kg

72 kg

Notes

References

List of qualified wrestlers per Country for the Beijing 2008 Olympic Games
Nominative list of the qualified wrestlers for the 2008 Beijing Olympic Games

Qualification for the 2008 Summer Olympics
2008
Q